Trabant is an electronic-pop/rock band from Reykjavík, Iceland, known for its raw but powerful music and flamboyant live performances. Trabant's style of music is a blend of electronic music, punk, R&B and pop.

Members 
Ragnar Kjartansson: singer
Þorvaldur Gröndal: electronic drummer
Viðar H. Gíslason: guitar / bass guitar
Hlynur A. Vilmarsson: keyboards
Gísli Galdur Þorgeirsson: DJ

Discography

Releases

Albums 
 Emotional (2005)
 Trabant á Bessastöðum (2004)
 Ballet (2002)
 Moment of Truth (2001)

Singles 
 The One (2006)
 Loving Me 12" (2006)
 Maria 12" (2006)
 Nasty Boy 12" (2006)
 Superman 7" (2002)
 Superman (2002)
 Enter Spacebar Remixes (2001)
 Enter Spacebar (2001)

Other 
 Lobster or Fame - VA (2005)
 Mixed Live: Gus Gus - VA (2003)

External links 
Trabant on Myspace
12 Tonar (record label) website
Southern Fried Records website

Icelandic electronic rock musical groups
Icelandic electronic music groups
Musical groups from Reykjavík